BO3 or variant may refer to:

 Borate (boron trioxide) BO3
 Call of Duty: Black Ops III
 Bo.3, see List of aircraft (B)#Borel
 BO3 in IAU Minor Planet
 Acronym for “best of 3” (sports)

See also
 Bo-Bo-Bo
 3BO FM